Purcell is an unincorporated community in Doniphan County, Kansas, United States.

History
Purcell was founded about 1886. John Purcell was one of the earliest settlers.

A post office was opened in Purcell in 1887, and remained in operation until it was discontinued in 1956.

St. Mary's Catholic Church, which is listed on the National Register of Historic Places, is located in Purcell.

References

Further reading

External links
 Doniphan County maps: Current, Historic, KDOT

Unincorporated communities in Doniphan County, Kansas
Unincorporated communities in Kansas
1886 establishments in Kansas
Populated places established in 1886